is a Japanese tokusatsu drama. It is the 32nd entry in the Kamen Rider franchise and the third series of the Reiwa period, which celebrates the 50th anniversary of the franchise.

Main characters

Kamen Rider Revice
Kamen Rider Revice is the titular duo of Ikki Igarashi and his inner demon partner Vice who utilize , a series of rubber stamp-like items reverse engineered from the Giff Stamp and designed to utilize the power of inner demons as well as channel the human user's genetic memory. Utilizing the  Vistamp in conjunction with the  belt, Ikki and Vice transform into Kamen Riders Revi and Vice  respectively. As Rex Genome, they gain increased leg and tail strength respectively. Additionally, the duo possess several other Vistamps, each of which is based on a different animal, and their corresponding  forms are modeled after a different past Heisei or Reiwa Kamen Rider:

: A Kamen Rider W-themed form accessed from the  Vistamp that grants Revice limited aerokinesis.
: A Kamen Rider Joker-themed form accessed from the Condor Vistamp that possesses half of Eagle Genome's power. This form appears exclusively in the film Kamen Rider: Beyond Generations.
: A Kamen Rider Den-O-themed form accessed from the  Vistamp that arms Revi with the twin  boomerangs and equips Vice with the twin arm-mounted .
: A Kamen Rider Faiz-themed form accessed from the  Vistamp that grants Revi supersonic speed and transforms Vice into a hoverbike for Revi to use. Vice in this form first appears in the Kamen Rider Revice film of the same name.
: A Kamen Rider Kuuga-themed form accessed from the  Vistamp that grants Revice limited pyrokinesis.
: A Kamen Rider Decade-themed form accessed from the  Vistamp that equips Revi with the twin arm-mounted  blades and grants Vice the ability to fire shark tooth-like projectiles. This form first appears in the Kamen Rider Revice film of the same name.
: A Kamen Rider Ex-Aid-themed form accessed from the  Vistamp that grants Revi proficiency in urban warfare and transforms Vice into a skateboard for Revi to use.
: A Kamen Rider Fourze-themed form accessed from the  Vistamp that equips Revi with the  gauntlets and grants Vice increased offensive capabilities.
: A Kamen Rider Gaim-themed form accessed from the  Vistamp that arms Revi with the  bladed bow and grants Vice the use of mantis-oriented kenpō.
: A Kamen Rider Zi-O-themed form accessed from the  Vistamp that equips Revi with the extendable  and grants Vice increased defensive capabilities.
: A Kamen Rider Zero-One-themed form accessed from the  Vistamp that grants Revice increased jumping and kicking capabilities. This form first appears in the film Kamen Rider: Beyond Generations.
: A Kamen Rider Build-themed form accessed from the  Vistamp that equips Revi with a pair of boxing gloves and shrinks Vice so he can reside in Revi's pouch. This form appears exclusively in the Hyper Battle DVD special.
: A Kamen Rider 2-themed form accessed from the  Vistamp. This form appears exclusively in the Hyper Battle DVD special.

Additionally, Ikki can utilize unique Vistamps to achieve stronger versions of his Rex Genome:
: A form accessed from the dinosaur egg-themed  Vistamp that grants Revi cryokinesis and the ability to create constructs of his Remix modes for combat assistance. Later in the series, George upgrades the Barid Rex Vistamp so that Vice can assume his corresponding Genome on his own.
: A form accessed from the Barid Rex and  Vistamps that grants Revi pyrokinesis, Vice a variation of Revi's Barid Rex Genome and powers, and both the use of the  ability where they summon a fire/ice hybrid version of their Rex Genome's Remix mode for combat assistance.
: An imperfect fusion form accessed from the paint roller-themed  Vistamp, which can also be used as a knuckleduster, that initially swaps Revi and Vice's corporeal states before slowly fusing them together.
Kamen Rider Revice: The true form of Jack Revice accessed from the storm-themed  Vistamp that completes Revice's fusion, which grants aero- and electrokinesis, use of the Rolling Vistamp as a weapon, and a separate partially corporeal body for Vice after cancelling the transformation.
: The ultimate form of Kamen Rider Revice accessed from the two-in-one  Vistamp, which consists of a maxilla-themed  half used by Ikki to transform into  and a mandible-themed  half used by Vice in conjunction with his own Revice Driver to transform into , that grants magnokinesis, self-duplicating capabilities, and the use of the  ability where Revi transforms Vice into a ball-like projectile.
: A fusion form of Kamen Riders Revice, Live, Evil, and Jeanne accessed from the  Vistamp that grants Ikki the use of his siblings' Rider powers and weaponry. This form appears exclusively in the film Kamen Rider Revice the Movie: Battle Familia.
: A form accessed from the  Vistamp. This form appears exclusively in the stage show Kamen Rider Revice: Final Stage.

While participating in the Desire Royale tournament in the film Kamen Rider Geats × Revice: Movie Battle Royale, both Kamen Riders Revi and Vice temporarily utilize Desire Drivers in place of their Revice Drivers.

Ikki Igarashi
 is the oldest son of the Igarashi family who can become . Originally, he was a promising soccer player who abandoned his career to live a normal life and help with the Igarashi family business out of guilt for accidentally injuring his friend  during high school. Additionally, he formed a contract with Vice to protect his family from Vail as a child, but repressed the memory. However, the Deadmans' threat on his family causes him to accept Fenix's offer to join them in their battle against the evil cult. Amidst their battles together, Ikki and Vice end up merging together, causing the former's repressed memories to resurface, and discover Ikki and his siblings are Giff's descendants. Furthermore, Ikki learns the contract he made with Vice as a child is slowly erasing his memories of those he considers family whenever he becomes Revi, though Vice sacrifices himself to prevent this. Ikki loses his memories of Vice as a result, though he rejoins the soccer team and resumes his normal life.

During the events of the film Kamen Rider Geats × Revice: Movie Battle Royale, Ikki participates in the Desire Royale as a Desire Grand Prix (DGP) Kamen Rider, with his primary Form Raise Buckle being .

Vice
 is the benevolent yet mischievous and wisecracking inner demon who embodies Ikki's repressed desires and selfishness. As Ikki is the only person to perceive his presence initially, the latter's transformation allows Vice to become . Thanks to his contract with Ikki, Vice obtains a corporeal form, which he uses to assist and protect Ikki as their lives are linked and should Ikki die, he will also perish. Moreover, Vice has a habit of breaking the fourth wall. After Ikki acquires the Gundephone 50, Vice can enter its system, which allows him to communicate with people without transforming.

Late into the series, it is revealed that Vice first manifested during Ikki's childhood when Vail destroyed the first version of Shiawaseyu and formed a contract with the boy to protect Ikki's family. Ikki repressed the memory while Vice went dormant until the former acquires the Revice Driver in the present. Furthermore, Vice became a technological genius following his re-awakening, which he primarily uses to maintain Ikki's father, Genta's, desire to promote Shiawaseyu through online videos. Eventually, after Ikki loses all memory of his family, Vice decides to play the role of a villain and force Ikki to fight him in a suicidal gambit to restore his partner's memory with help from his host's family and their allies, among other people they had helped. Following his successful self-sacrifice, Vice is memorialized by Shiawaseyu painting a rubber duck with Vice's face to serve as the bathhouse's "guardian spirit" and Daiji rebranding the joint Fenix-Weekend organization as Blue Bird.

During the events of the film Kamen Rider Geats × Revice: Movie Battle Royale, Vice is temporarily revived and participates in the Desire Royale as a DGP Kamen Rider, with his primary Form Raise Buckle being . While transformed, he is equipped with either the  gauntlets or the  sabatons.

Kamen Riders Live and Evil
Kamen Riders Live and Evil are Riders who usually share one body between Daiji Igarashi and his inner demon, Kagero. They utilize the  Vistamp in conjunction with the  belt and the  device to transform into their respective  forms:
 Daiji utilizes the Two Side Weapon in its  mode to transform into the Honduran white bat-themed . While transformed, he gains increased agility and precision.
 Kagero utilizes the Two Side Weapon in its  mode to transform into the brown long-eared bat-themed . While transformed, he gains flight and stealth capabilities.

Similarly to Revice, both Live and Evil can also utilize other Vistamps to assume different Genome forms, with the latter assuming dark Heisei Kamen Rider-themed forms:
Jackal Genome: A Kamen Rider Ex-Aid-themed form if used by Live or a Kamen Rider Genm-themed form if used by Evil accessed from the Jackal Vistamp that grants superhuman speed.

Additionally, Daiji as well as Kagero can utilize unique Vistamps to achieve stronger flying-type Genome forms:
: The true form of Holy Live accessed from the pied crow-themed  Vistamp, the evolved form of Holy Wing Vistamp, that grants a pair of Perfect Wings as well as allow Daiji to use Kagero's Evil Blade and summon a shadowy version of the latter's Bat Genome.
 and : The respective ultimate forms of Kamen Riders Live and Evil accessed from the  Vistamp in conjunction with the Revice Driver in place of the Two SiDriver that grants the use of Revice's Ohinbuster 50 and Osutoderuhammer 50 as well as a separate body for Evil. This form appears exclusively in the V-Cinema Revice Forward: Kamen Rider Live & Evil & Demons.

Daiji Igarashi
 is Ikki's athletic younger brother and an honor student who volunteers to work for Fenix as a squad leader and the intended recipient of the Revice Driver before his brother, Ikki, gets ahold of it. Following the latter event and Hiromi Kadota's failed attempt to use the Revice Driver, Daiji is left traumatized. Although Daiji holds no ill intent towards Ikki, the former's desire to stand out stems from a mix of jealousy and an inferiority complex towards the latter, resulting his own inner demon, Kagero, immediately possessing his body shortly before Daiji receives new Rider equipment from George Karizaki. Kagero attempts to use Daiji to kill Ikki and Vice, but Daiji becomes aware of Kagero's presence and initially struggles to keep the demon from hurting his family until he realizes that they have always looked up to him, allowing him to regain control of his body. Upon discovering he and his siblings are descendants of Giff and being separated from Kagero, Daiji settles his differences with the latter in combat, with Kagero seemingly dying in the process. This absence causes a detrimental effect on Daiji's sense of self as he is slowly corrupted by his own ideals. Following his colleague Akemi Mikoshiba's death, he betrays his family and allies to avenge her. To this end, he kills Akaishi, only to take his role as Giff's protector and attempt to form a pact with the demon, only to be thwarted by Vice. With Hiromi Kadota's help, Daiji realizes the error of his ways and reunites with Kagero. After helping Vice restore Ikki's memories, Daiji leads the merged Fenix-Weekend organization, Blue Bird, in the former's memory.

Kagero
 is Daiji's malevolent and calculative inner demon who embodies his host's jealousy and inferiority complex towards Ikki and trauma from overusing George Karizaki's Vistamp-based Rider System. At the time of his awakening, Kagero briefly possesses Daiji's body and secretly steals a Vistamp from Fenix. When George notices Kagero's presence within Daiji's body, he allows Daiji to transform into a Kamen Rider for the first time, allowing Kagero to completely possess his host's body. After the demon joins Deadmans, Fenix's executives and Daiji discover what happened and the former bar the latter's family from knowing until Kagero reveals his presence to them. While attempting to eliminate Ikki, Kagero discovers George used him to help Daiji regain control of his body before Kamen Rider Revice defeat him. Despite this, Kagero is able to retake control when his host becomes incapacitated. Gradually weakening after the Igarashi siblings discover their connection to Giff, Kagero acquires the Crow Vistamp and uses it to separate himself from Daiji so they can settle their differences in a duel. Daiji emerges victorious, with a mortally wounded Kagero giving him the Vistamp before entering it in order to heal. Kagero's absence causes Daiji to become unstable and more reckless and adopt the former's warped outlook on justice until Daiji eventually sees the error of his ways, fully healing Kagero.

Sakura Igarashi
 is Ikki and Daiji's younger sister, a high school student, and a karateka. Following Kagero's awakening and possession of Daiji, Sakura develops a grudge against Deadmans for ruining her family and develops a rivalry with cult member, Aguilera. In pursuit of joining her brothers in combat, Sakura receives her own Rider equipment from a mysterious individual, later revealed to be an agent from the secret organization, Weekend. Following Giff's defeat and Vice's sacrifice, Sakura plans to enter a medical school.

Sakura utilizes the  Vistamp in conjunction with the  belt to transform into . While transformed, she gains increased hand-to-hand combat capabilities. She can also utilize Shōwa and Heisei Kamen Rider-themed Vistamps to transform Lovekov into different weapon-based Genome forms.

: A Kamen Rider ZX-themed Vistamp that transforms Lovekov into the twin  war fans.
: A Kamen Rider V3-themed Vistamp that transforms Lovekov into the  bazooka.
: A Kamen Rider Hibiki-themed Vistamp that transforms Lovekov into the  scythe, which can extract humans from their Phase 3 Deadman forms.
: A Kamen Rider Agito-themed Vistamp that transforms Lovekov into the twin bayonet-like  submachine guns. This form first appears in the film Kamen Rider Revice the Movie: Battle Familia.

Following Lovekov's evolution, Sakura utilizes the  Vistamp to transform into , which turns the former into her armor that is equipped with five bladed  appendages.

Lovekov
 is Sakura's benevolent plush toy mascot-like inner demon and partner who possesses limited speech capacity, though she can speak full sentences in Sakura's mind. As a manifestation of the latter's weaknesses and childhood past-self, the former lacks her partner's combat capabilities but can be transformed into weapons for Sakura to use. While normally non-combative compared to Vice and Kagero, Lovekov can lash out at humans while being influenced by Giff's aura. Eventually growing tired of being put on the sidelines, Lovekov tries to evolve so she can fight alongside Sakura. Following her evolution at the same time after defeating Giff together with her siblings and allies, Lovekov can finally speak full sentence outside Sakura's mind.

During the events of the film Kamen Rider Revice the Movie: Battle Familia, Lovekov temporarily gains a teenage female humanoid form.

Recurring characters

Shiawaseyu
The  is a sentō run by the Igarashi family.

Yukimi Igarashi
 is Genta's wife and Ikki, Daiji and Sakura's mother. Following Deadmans' first attack during Daiji's promotion ceremony, Yukimi is left temporarily hospitalized. It is later revealed that Yukimi was involved in early Deadmen-related incidents surrounding her husband's tragic life 25 years ago. Seven years later, following Vail's attack on the first Shiawaseyu, Yukimi and one of her husband's friends, Shōzō Irabu and Masumi Karizaki, secretly kept in touch while ensuring her children never learned of the incident until they became Kamen Riders and Vail returned in the present.

During the events of the film Kamen Rider Revice the Movie: Battle Familia, Yukimi's spiritual angel-like inner demon awakens to purify those of her children and create the Fifty Gale Vistamp so they can become Kamen Rider Igarashi.

Genta Igarashi
 is Yukimi's husband and Ikki, Daiji, and Sakura's father. He usually skips work to create promotional videos for the sentō. Later in the series, Genta's real name is revealed to be , a former operative of NOAH who was involved in a near-fatal biking incident and Masumi Karizaki experimented on him to save his life. Following this, Vail emerged and murdered Genta's parents, leading to the latter joining NOAH to find the demon. Amidst his quest, he met and fell in love with Yukimi and received help from Masumi and Shōzō Irabu to leave NOAH, only to learn NOAH and Vail were involved in his parents' murder in the process. After Genta chose to start a family with Yukimi, Vail mounted a failed attempt on their lives before Masumi extracted the demon and sealed him in the Demons Driver. As a result, Genta lost his memories as Shiranami, but became able to survive without a heart as it was extracted alongside Vail. In the present, Hideo Akaishi helps Vail break free of the Demons Driver and re-possess Genta, forcing him into hiding with Irabu to protect his family while he struggles to suppress Vail. Before he does so, Genta entrusts his children to right his past wrongs and protect Yukimi in his stead in the event he sacrifices himself to stop Vail. In response to Giff's invasion, Genta volunteers to undergo a cell transfusion so the Karizakis can create the Giffard Rex Vistamp with the intention of sacrificing himself, though Genta survives the procedure and goes on to settle his rivalry with Vail.

While under Vail's control, Genta utilizes the  Vistamp in conjunction with the  belt to transform into .

After recovering his memories, Genta asks George to upgrade the Vail Driver into the  belt and create the  Vistamp so that the former can transform into . While transformed, he is equipped with six back-mounted  manipulators. He can also utilize past Heisei Rider-themed Vistamps to assume different Genomix modes similarly to Kamen Riders Demons.

: A Kamen Rider Ryuki-themed Vistamp that equips Destream with the left arm-mounted  cannon.
: A Kamen Rider Wizard-themed Vistamp that equips Destream with the right arm-mounted  drill.
Kong: A Kamen Rider Fourze-themed Vistamp that equips Destream with the  gauntlets.

Shōzō Irabu
 is a regular customer at Shiawaseyu who provides information on Deadmans to the Igarashis. Later in the series, he is revealed to be a spy working for an anti-NOAH organization who posed as a member of NOAH, through which he met and befriended Genta Igarashi and Masumi Karizaki 25 years prior to the series. Following Vail's attack on the Igarashis 18 years prior to the series, Irabu maintained contact with Weekend and acts as Genta and Yukimi's caretaker while initially concealing his true intentions from their children at their behest until Vail breaks free in the present.

Fenix
The  is a government organization based in the  that Hideo Akaishi established to ostensibly counter the Deadmans' threat while secretly facilitating his goal of reviving Giff. Following his revival, Giff destroys the Sky Base, killing most of Fenix's operatives. The survivors transfer their operations to an urban development site called ARARAT in the hopes of developing inner demon removal stamps, only to create stamps that have the opposite effect and strengthen Giff. Following Akaishi's demise, Giff's proper defeat, and Vice's sacrifice, Daiji takes command of Fenix's remnants and merges them with that of Weekend's to form .

Yūjirō Wakabayashi
 is a stern commander who secretly cares for his subordinates. During Ikki and Vice's first transformation into Kamen Rider Revice, Yūjirō was murdered by the Chameleon Deadman, who later assumes his identity.

Hideo Akaishi
 is a millennia-old Aztec king who once led a kingdom in opposition to Giff before his people were wiped out. Akaishi formed a contract with Giff to spare the rest of humanity from the latter's wrath in exchange for serving as his emissary. The pact resulted in Akaishi becoming an immortal with a drastically slow aging process and the ability to become a Giffdemos at the cost of a deformed right hand, which he covers with a glove. He would later go on to become a NOAH researcher and a member of the US government's Department of Defense in order to secretly manipulate them into improving Giff's potential. Twenty-five years prior to the series, he and his NOAH superior, Agariyama, worked with Vail to murder Genta's parents and use him in the organization's experiments until Genta, among others, leave NOAH. Following this and NOAH's destruction, Akaishi found Vail in the Demons Driver and stole Giff's casket to enact a new plan to facilitate Giff's revival. While publicly founding Fenix and becoming its director-general to cover his activities, he also secretly founded Deadmans and entrusted the newly recruited Orteca to serve as the cult's public face and watch over Giff's casket in his stead.

In the present, as Genta's offspring become Kamen Riders, Akaishi grants permission for the Demons Driver's field deployment to manipulate Hiromi Kadota and Orteca into eventually freeing Vail and sacrificing Orteca to revive Giff. Following Kagero's death, Akaishi manipulates Daiji into unknowingly disrupting his spiritual balance and defect to his cause. After making an enemy out of Hikaru Ushijima and being defeated by Kamen Rider Ultimate Revice, Akaishi sacrifices his immortality in exchange for Giff reviving him as a red Gigademos, deeming humanity beyond redemption and resolving to kill everyone. However, he is defeated by Hikaru and killed by a vengeful Daiji.

Akemi Mikoshiba
 is a doctor working for Fenix. After discovering his true intentions, she is captured by Hideo Akaishi, who forces her to offer herself to Giff, transforming into a Giffdemos in the process. Despite this, her will remains partially intact. She is later killed by Akaishi to prevent the Igarashis and their allies from saving her and learning Giff's weaknesses from her, though she inspires Genta Igarashi to allow the Karizakis to give his son Ikki a Giff cell transfusion and create the Giffard Rex Vistamp.

Other members
: A Fenix squad leader who joined the organization alongside Hiromi Kadota and Chigusa Yamagiri as cadets. Upon discovering Akaishi's true nature, Tabuchi evacuates former Deadman contractors from the Sky Base's rehabilitation center before Giff destroys it.

Aguilera
, also known by her pseudonym , is the Deadmans' acting leader who was groomed from childhood to become Giff's bride. Due to her lonely upbringing, she does not believe in love and views families as a deceptive happiness. While she later learns she is to become a sacrifice for Giff instead, with her body becoming his vessel, she initially accepts her fate until Fenix attacks Deadmans' base. After escaping, she transforms into a Phase 3 Deadman and feigns returning to Deadmans so she can learn Orteca's true motives. She also intends to willingly sacrifice herself to revive Giff, only to discover she inadvertently made herself incompatible due to being a Phase 3 Deadman. Following Orteca's death, Giff's revival, and the latter showing his true colors, a disillusioned Aguilera goes into self-imposed exile. Aguilera would later resurface to force Sakura to kill her, only to be separated from her Deadman form and have her humanity restored by Kamen Rider Jeanne. After realizing she should continue to live, Aguilera joins Weekend, refines her Vistamp to prevent Vail from stealing it while aiding Sakura and her brothers as Kamen Rider Aguilera, and eventually clears her name. Following Giff's defeat and Vice's sacrifice, Aguilera becomes an agent of the Fenix-Weekend merger, Blue Bird.

Aguilera utilizes her personal Queen Bee Vistamp to transform into the following forms:
: A form accessed from the Queen Bee Proto Vistamp.
: A form accessed from the refined Queen Bee Vistamp in conjunction with the  belt. In this form, she retains most of her former Deadman form's powers and wields the twin . She can also utilize other Vistamps to summon different weapon-based Genomes similarly to Jeanne.
: A Kamen Rider OOO-themed Vistamp that arms Aguilera with the twin  wind and fire wheels. This weapon appears exclusively in the web special Kamen Rider Jeanne & Kamen Rider Aguilera with Girls Remix.

Deadmans
To do so, they provide people with Vistamps to form a contract with their inner demon, manifest the latter as a Phase 1 Deadman, merge with it to achieve its Phase 2 form and fully integrate with it to achieve its Phase 3 form. Compared to the other phases, humans that become Gifftex Deadmen run the risk of being killed if they are defeated in combat, though they can be separated by Kamen Rider Revice's Barid and Volcano Rex Genome's powers. However, if a Deadmans member who was originally chosen to become a sacrifice for Giff's revival but became a Phase 3 Deadman instead, they are deemed incompatible as a sacrifice. Additionally, Deadmans members can also use Giff Junior Vistamp on the weakest of their followers to create  foot soldiers to aid them in battle.

Giff
 is the mysterious progenitor of all demons who thrives on negative energy and came to Earth several millennia prior to feed off the darkness of humanity, but came to despise them for those who fear him and abuse his abilities for selfish ends. Convinced by Hideo Akashi to spare humanity, Giff made him and Azuma loyal followers to manipulate humanity to ensure his conquest of Earth is unopposed. Giff then entered into a deep sleep within a sarcophagus-like chrysalis called  and arranged for NOAH to recover it fifty years prior to the series. After the organization fell, Akaishi retrieved the casket and entrusted it to a NOAH splinter faction called Deadmans and its leader Orteca, who seek to revive Giff via a ritual involving six  Deadmen and a designated sacrifice. While the Igarashi siblings disrupt the ritual and Fenix recovers the sarcophagus in the present, Giff absorbs the remains of the Deadmen and Gifftarians that the Igarashi siblings defeated over the course of their battles against Deadmans. After bringing Orteca into his private dimension, which is Giff's metaphysical stomach where those sacrificed to him end up, Giff fully revives into his true form.

After Giff pulls Vice into his dimension, he adjusts his plans to exterminate all of humanity save for the Igarashi siblings, who he considers family, before Ultimate Revice and Evilyty Live temporarily seal him within his dimension. Upon returning, Giff produces parasites from his cocoon and uses them to take over humanity's inner demons, with an enthralled Vice by his side. However, Vice destroys his sarcophagus to remove the demon's invulnerability before the Igarashi family's Kamen Riders destroy Giff, whose eyes end up in George's possession.

Other members
: A corrupt lawyer who joined Deadmans to improve his status by using the Kangaroo Deadman to help him and an equally corrupt judge rig trials they were involved in and extort anyone who figured out their plans. However, Kamen Rider Revice destroy the monster and his reputation before Kudō and the judge are arrested by Fenix. Sometime later, the Chameleon Deadman breaks out Kudō due to his high potential for becoming a Gifftex Deadman. After receiving the Saber Tiger Proto Vistamp, Kudō transforms into the Phase 2  in an attempt to get revenge on Ikki. Despite evolving into a Gifftex Deadman, he is defeated by the Igarashi siblings and spirited away into Giff's dimension in a state of suspended animation.
: A corrupt psychology counselor who works with Deadmans by recruiting and blackmailing victims before creating duplicates of his personal Planaria Proto Vistamp to fuse them with weaker versions of his Phase 2  form in order to fulfill their contract and expand the cult's ranks. He also seeks to merge with Giff and become part of Aguilera's family as he harbors an unrequited love for her as well as forms a rivalry with Sakura Igarashi after fusing her karate instructor, with one of his Planaria Deadmen. While attempting to kidnap one of Sakura's friends and forcibly fuse them with one of his Planaria Deadmen, Julio fuses Haitani with it instead, though the latter survives and evolves into a Gifftex Deadman. Despite this, he is defeated by the Igarashi siblings and spirited away into Giff's dimension in a state of suspended animation.
: A mysterious figure who used the Chameleon Proto Vistamp to assume a Phase 2 Deadman form with camouflage and shapeshifting abilities. He murdered Yūjirō Wakabayashi and assumed his identity in order to infiltrate Fenix and retrieve the Giff Stamp. After succeeding in his goal and evolving into a Gifftex Deadman, he attempts to ruin the Igarashi family, only to be thwarted by Fenix, defeated by Kamen Rider Revi, and spirited away into Giff's dimension in a state of suspended animation. The Chameleon Deadman is portrayed by  while Kazuya Tanabe portrays his Yūjirō Wakabayashi disguise.
: An office worker who is loyal to Orteca. She allows him to sacrifice her in order to spawn a Gifftarian, but it is destroyed by Kamen Rider Jack Revice.
: A member of Fenix who was ordered to infiltrate Deadmans, but defected to them and became a double agent. Orteca sacrifices her to spawn a Gifftarian against her will, but it is destroyed by Kamen Rider Demons.

Gifftarians
 are demons created when a human is exposed to the Giff Stamp that possess the twin arm-mounted  blades and are more powerful than Phase 2 Deadmen. Upon exposure to the stamp, a human host will become enveloped in a chrysalis, which their inner demon devours to create a physical body for itself while the host is destroyed in the process.

Later in the series, a revived Giff uses the Giff Stamp to spawn , pure versions of the Gifftarians which possess the twin arm-mounted  blades and power on par with Phase 3 Deadmen.

Giffdemos
 are demons created when a human is exposed to Giff's energy. Giff can also create , stronger versions of the Giffdemos.

Deadman combatants
When a Deadman is defeated, their corresponding Proto Vistamp becomes purified and either becomes part of a Kamen Rider's arsenal or transferred to Fenix's custody. Through the making of a higher-class contract, a Vistamp user can merge with their Deadman to assume a  form at the cost of their humanity and gradually transform into a Gifftex Deadman. Additionally, contract holders can use Proto Vistamps to create duplicates, use them on others, and continue to create duplicate Vistamps by summoning its corresponding Deadman.

: A mammoth-themed monster born from convict  and the Mammoth Proto Vistamp. It is destroyed by Kamen Rider Vice.
: A Tyrannosaurus-themed monster born from Hiromi Kadota using the Rex Vistamp during his failed attempt to use the Revice Driver without proper training. It is destroyed by Kamen Rider Revi.
: A mantis-themed monster born from caddie  using the Kamakiri Proto Vistamp that acts on its host's desire to get revenge on his abusive boss Araki for firing him. It is destroyed by Kamen Rider Revice while Ibata and Araki reconcile.
: A megalodon-themed monster born from professional golfer  using the Megalodon Proto Vistamp that acts on its host's desire to get revenge on Ibata for trying to kill him. It is destroyed by Kamen Rider Revice while the purified Megalodon Vistamp is transferred to Fenix's custody and Araki and Ibata reconcile.
: A gorilla-themed monster born from Ikki's childhood friend, and the Kong Proto Vistamp that acts on its host's desire to get revenge on her mother  for neglecting her and focusing on her younger sister . Ayaka hires an accomplice to throw suspicion off of herself before merging with her Deadman so she can kill Miharu and make Taeko suffer. However, Revice separate Ayaka from the Kong Deadman before destroying it and transferring the purified Kong Vistamp to Fenix's custody while Ayaka is hospitalized, with Taeko taking care of her.
: A lion-themed monster born from online streamer  and the Lion Proto Vistamp, which he received from Kagero. Masao has the Lion Deadman assist him in filming viral videos until it is destroyed by Kamen Rider Revi before helping Fenix lure out Kagero. Sometime after Giff's defeat, Masao restarts his online streaming career.
: A kangaroo-themed monster born from Yasushi Kudō and the Kangaroo Proto Vistamp. It is destroyed by Kamen Rider Revice.
: A cheetah-themed monster born from struggling hospital director  and the Cheetah Proto Vistamp. Upon discovering his son  was suspended from high school for stealing from fellow students to become a thief, Maezono fuses with the Cheetah Deadman to cover for his son. Hitoshi realizes both his suspension and thievery were his fault, but Maezono refuses to let him turn himself in until Kamen Rider Revice separate Maezono from the Cheetah Deadman and destroys it.
The Super Brachio Deadman is destroyed by Kamen Rider Live.
: A shark-themed monster born from entertainment agent  and the Shark Proto Vistamp. Experiencing mixed feelings over being left behind by her clients and rising comedy group, Kuki Kaidan, and frustration over her staff's mistreatment of the comedians, Mayu spawned the Shark and Elephant Deadmen to help her secure a successful career for her clients, only to inadvertently put them in danger. After Kamen Rider Jack Revice destroy the Shark and Elephant Deadmen, Mayu apologizes to Kuki Kaidan before she is taken into custody.
: An elephant-themed monster born from Mayu Tominaga and the Elephant Proto Vistamp. It is destroyed by Kamen Rider Jack Revice.
: A Rafflesia-themed monster born from voice actor Subaru Kimura and the Rafflesia Proto Vistamp, which he spawned out of guilt for an incident between his students, Ikki and Kōji "Zico" Ikeyama, during the end of their high school soccer career. After learning that Ikki was losing his memories due to his fights with Deadmans, Kimura uses the Rafflesia Deadman to trap his former students in an illusionary dream world to make them reconcile with each other, which allows Ikki to partially regain his memories. However, Giff's influence causes the monster to betray Kimura and go on a rampage. After Ikki and Zico reconcile and wake up, Kimura willingly turns himself in to Fenix and entrusts Zico with continuing his voice acting work in his stead while Kamen Rider Revice destroy the Rafflesia Deadman. Subaru Kimura portrays a fictionalized version of himself, in addition to voicing Vice.

Other Deadman combatants
: A spider-themed monster born from an unnamed office worker and the Spider Proto Vistamp. It is destroyed by Kamen Rider Revice. This Deadman appears exclusively in the Kamen Rider Revice film of the same name and the manga Kamen Rider Revice: My Brother Is Kamen Rider.
It acts on Junpei's resentment towards his successful friends for abandoning him until it is destroyed by Kamen Riders Saber and Espada while a reformed Junpei willingly gives the Batta Vistamp to Fenix and accepts his friends' decisions to move on. This Deadman appears exclusively in the Kamen Rider Saber epilogue special.
: An orangutan-themed monster. Unlike other Deadmen, Tarō Gondawara uses a Monster Stamp to transform instead of a Vistamp. This Deadman appears exclusively in the special Kamen Rider Revice: The Mystery.
: A diminutive koala-themed monster born from an unnamed comedian and the Koala Proto Vistamp capable of creating human-sized Koala Deadmen. It is destroyed by Kamen Rider Vice. This Deadman appears exclusively in the Hyper Battle DVD special.
: A mandrill-themed monster born from Tony and the Mandrill Proto Vistamp. It is destroyed by Kamen Rider Chimera. This Deadman appears exclusively in the film Kamen Rider Revice the Movie: Battle Familia.
: An octopus-themed monster born from one of Yūichirō Wakabayashi's comrades and the Octopus Proto Vistamp. It is destroyed by Kamen Riders Aguilera and Juuga. This Deadman appears exclusively in the stage show Kamen Rider Revice: Final Stage.
: A turtle-themed monster born from one of Yūichirō Wakabayashi's comrades and the Turtle Proto Vistamp. It is destroyed by Kamen Riders Invincible Jeanne and Demons. This Deadman appears exclusively in the stage show Kamen Rider Revice: Final Stage.

Kamen Rider Demons
 is a moniker used by those who utilize the  Vistamp in conjunction with the  belt, which contains Vail and Masumi Karizaki originally intended to be reverse-engineer from the Vail Driver using NOAH's resources twenty-five years prior to the series before Fenix completed it in the present. Due to prolonged usage of the belt, Vail is eventually able to break free, though he maintains his connection to the Demons Driver.

While transformed, the user can produce  for multiple purposes and stick to walls and ceilings. Using Shōwa Kamen Rider-themed Vistamps, they can assume varying  modes, which change and enhance part of their body. With incompatible users, the demon will only transform for short periods of time, limit them to one Genomix, and feed on their life force, which physically ages them at an accelerated rate as a side effect and causes them to develop an addiction to the Demons Driver's power. With compatible users, they do not suffer side effects and are able to use multiple Genomixes depending on Vail's mood. Additionally, users who already possess an inner demon are immune to Vail's powers, though said demon will be awakened following contact with the Demons Driver.

: A Kamen Rider 1-themed Vistamp that grants a pair of  legs.
: A Kamen Rider Amazon-themed Vistamp that equips Demons with the right arm-mounted  drill.
: A Kamen Rider X-themed Vistamp that grants the  tail.
: A Kamen Rider Black-themed Vistamp that equips Demons with the twin  claws.

Additionally, Demons can also use other Vistamps, such as the following:
: A Kamen Rider Joker-themed Vistamp that grants a pair of  wings.
Komodo Dragon: A Kamen Rider Ryuki-themed Vistamp that equips Demons with a left arm-mounted cannon. This Genomix appears exclusively in Revice Forward: Kamen Rider Live & Evil & Demons.

After George upgrades the Demons Driver to counteract Vail's connection to it and make it safer to use by making the user's inner demon power it, a user can utilize the  Vistamp instead of the Spider Vistamp to transform into . While transformed, they can use the right shoulder-mounted  mantle to fly while maintaining their Genomixes, though overuse of these will degrade the user's compatibility and awaken their inner demon over time.

While transformed, both soldiers wield Revice's Ohinbuster 50 while Demons Trooper α also wields Revice's Osutoderuhammer 50.

The Demons Driver system is voiced by Kenjiro Tsuda, who also voices Vail.

Hiromi Kadota
 is an impulsive and serious Fenix commander from Miyagi Prefecture who lost his father, and was bullied as a child until he had a dream that inspired him to become a hero. To achieve his dream, he eventually joined Fenix and attempts to use the Revice Driver despite not having the proper training, only to be demoted to squad leader when his inner demon ran amok. After Daiji is possessed by his inner demon Kagero, Hiromi is granted use of the Demons Driver despite not being its intended user. Following the revelation of his superior Wakabayashi being murdered by the Chameleon Deadman, Hiromi succeeds him as a new commander of Fenix. However, Hiromi soon learns the truth behind the Demons Driver and of a conspiracy within Fenix, transforming one final time to aid in Deadmans' leader, Orteca's, capture before resigning from Fenix and revealing what he learned to the Igarashi siblings. Hiromi then learns of director-general Hideo Akaishi's connection to Orteca, only to be seemingly killed by the latter. While Hiromi survived, he feigned amnesia and returned to his mother in their hometown to recover. Upon learning of what seemingly happened, his allies work to recover his memories until he reveals the truth and, with aid from Wakabayashi's spirit, rejoins them to face Giff by forming and taking command of the Kamen Rider Demons Corps and briefly re-assuming the mantle of Kamen Rider Demons to save Daiji from himself. Following Giff's death and Vice's sacrifice, Hiromi joins Fenix's successor organization, Blue Bird.

Sometime after the series finale, during the events of the film Revice Forward: Kamen Rider Live & Evil & Demons, Hiromi awakens a new inner demon named Muramasa, gains self-healing capabilities, and regains access to the Demons Driver, which he can now use in conjunction with the  Vistamp to transform into .

In the Beyond Generations side novel, which takes place in a dystopian future in the year 2071, Hiromi retires from being a Fenix officer and became a farmer when Diablo and his army of demons invaded Earth. At some point prior to Ryunosuke's arrival from the past, Hiromi reunited with the elderly George and gave him some of his harvested vegetables as a gift.

Orteca
, formerly known by his real name , is the co-leader of Deadmans and a former child prodigy who joined the cult due to feeling like an outcast and being abused by his father, from whom Orteca inherited an abusive attitude and superiority complex. Orteca initially manipulates Aguilera into believing she is the cult's leader and Giff's bride while posing as her right hand. When he reveals the truth however, she transforms herself into a Deadman and leaves the cult, forcing Orteca to alter his plans and restructure Deadmans. Despite being defeated and separated from his Deadman form by Kamen Rider Revice and Giff subsequently absorbing his Deadman essence, Orteca allows himself to be captured by Fenix so he can trade the Giff Stamp to Akaishi for the Demons Driver, escaping as the new Demons. While Vail exploits Orteca to break free from the Demons Driver, he allows Orteca to continue using his power until they are defeated by Kamen Rider Holy Live, after which Orteca abandons Vail and retrieves the Anomalocaris Proto Vistamp while committing human sacrifices to hasten Giff's revival until he is defeated by Kamen Rider Revice and devoured by Giff. Months later, Orteca is freed by Kamen Riders Ultimate Revice and Evilyty Live and promptly arrested by Weekend.

During the events of the film Kamen Rider Revice the Movie: Battle Familia, Orteca cooperates with George's plan to use the former and another Chimera Driver to break through the barrier surrounding Area 666 in exchange for a reduced sentence. He later attempts unsuccessfully to steal the belt, only to be re-imprisoned.

Orteca previously used his personal Daiouika Proto Vistamp to transform into his  form, which is armed with the umbrella-like  sword. After losing the Demons Driver, he utilizes the Anomalocaris Proto Vistamp and the Giff Stamp to absorb Giff and transform into his  form, which is also armed with the Paranegro.

George Karizaki
 is an eccentric genius scientist whose father, Masumi, developed the Vistamp Rider System thirty years prior to the series, which can only be used by humans who have tamed their inner demon partners, especially those with Giff cells, and grants the latter a physical form through various different means based on the transformation devices they were given. George is a fan of Kamen Riders, especially the Heisei era Riders, and designs Fenix's Rider equipment with them as inspiration. As a child, he unknowingly received Masumi's inner demon, Chic.

After Daiji defeats Orteca and Vail, George retrieves the Demons Driver and uses it to temporarily become the third Kamen Rider Demons, resisting the belt's temptation and unknowingly awakening Masumi's inner demon in the process. Following this, George upgrades the belt to work in conjunction with the Kuwagata Vistamp in order to transform into Kamen Rider Over Demons, stabilize it, and mass-produce the belt, only for Hideo Akaishi to break his arm. In response, George gives the Over Demons equipment to Hikaru Ushijima per the latter's request before successfully mass-producing the Demons Driver and entrusting the copies to Hiromi so he can form the Kamen Rider Demons Corps. Due to the varying crises he and his allies have faced, George moves in with the Igarashi family while his arm heals.

Following Masumi's passing and Giff's defeat, George resolves to create a new Rider System that does not need inner demons to power it due to being unable to reconcile with his father in time and while under Chic's influence. As a result, he creates the Chimera Driver during the events of Birth of Chimera and Kamen Rider Revice the Movie: Battle Familia before a freed Chic steals the belt and modifies it with one of Giff's eyes. George replicates Chic's modifications to create the  belt to use in conjunction with the  Vistamp he engineered from Revice's Vistamps to become  and attack other demon-based Riders to prove his tech's superiority over them and his father until he learns Masumi did cherish him and used George's childhood drawings as the basis for the Vistamp technology.

In an alternate timeline depicted in the film Kamen Rider: Beyond Generations, an elderly George goes into hiding after Diablo conquered Earth and creates the Cyclotron Driver to alter the past to avert this future from occurring. In addition to gaining Ryunosuke's help to get to the year 2021, George also uses his tablet to turn the time-displaced Vice, Daiji, Sakura, Touma Kamiyama, Rintaro Shindo, and Yuri into  to defend Ryunosuke's body from Diablo's army of Devil Riders.

Hikaru Ushijima
 is a young Weekend agent tasked with working undercover as Tasuke and Kimiko's son and a regular patron of Shiawaseyu. As part of his work, he enrolls in Sakura's karate dojo in order to secretly train her to become a Kamen Rider, developing a crush on her and befriending Julio in the process. In response to Giff, Vail, and Hideo Akaishi's escalating attempts to enact a demon apocalypse, Hikaru convinces George Karizaki to let him become Kamen Rider Over Demons to help their allies. After Akaishi kills Kimiko and Tasuke, Hikaru loses his compatibility with the Over Demons system while defeating Akaishi and chooses Julio to succeed him.

Julio
 is Aguilera's loyal bodyguard and a former trading card otaku who joined Deadmans under the name  after discovering his best friend,  was extorted by delinquents into betraying their friendship during their final year in high school. Despite becoming a Gifftex Deadman, Tamaki was not aware of Giff's intention to use Aguilera as a sacrifice instead of his bride and betrays Deadmans to protect her. Tamaki eventually forgives Okuda, only to transform into a Deadman Riot after Orteca sacrificed his friend to create a Gifftarian. However, Kamen Rider Revice separate Tamaki from his Deadman form, which is absorbed by Giff, and restores Tamaki's humanity in the process. Following this, Tamaki gains a job at Shiawaseyu and joins forces with Revice and their allies to defeat Giff. After receiving the Week EnDriver and the Buffalo Vistamp, he intends to become a Kamen Rider, only to lose the Vistamp to Vail. Nevertheless, in response to the Over Demons system rendering Hikaru Ushijima incompatible with it, Tamaki takes over the Over Demons mantle at the former's behest. Following Giff's defeat and Vice's sacrifice, Tamaki becomes an agent of the newly formed Blue Bird organization.

Tamaki utilizes his personal Wolf Proto Vistamp to transform into his  form, which is armed with the trumpet-like  handgun. After losing control of his anger, he evolves into a berserker form called .

During the events of the film Kamen Rider Geats × Revice: Movie Battle Royale, Tamaki utilizes the  Vistamp to transform into .

Weekend
 is a mysterious resistance group founded by Masumi Karizaki and based underneath his family home that investigates Fenix and Deadmans' dubious activities through the Igarashi family. As such, they maintain surveillance over the family by finishing George Karizaki's Libera Driver for Sakura's use and creating the Rolling Vistamp for Ikki and Vice. Later in the series, Weekend uses the Libera Driver's blueprints to develop the Week EnDriver and train Julio and Aguilera in using should anything happen to one of them. Following Giff's revival and the destruction of Fenix, Weekend publicly reveal themselves, provide temporary shelters, and urge the public and surviving Fenix operatives to help them face Giff. Following Giff's defeat and Vice's sacrifice, Weekend merges with Fenix, initially under the latter's banner before eventually renaming themselves to Blue Bird.

Masumi Karizaki
 is the leader of Weekend, George Karizaki's father, and a former member of NOAH who found the Giff Stamp and, using his son's drawings as inspiration, reverse-engineered Vistamp technology from it for the sake of world peace. After inadvertently giving rise to Vail and learning his fellow members Agariyama and Hideo Akaishi formed separate plots to use his Vistamps for sinister purposes, Masumi secretly transferred his inner demon Chic to a young George before he saved Genta by sealing Vail in the Demons Driver. However, these acts left Masumi ill and with disfiguring burns, forcing him to wear a mask. Despite this, he was able to fake his death and found Weekend to watch over the Igarashis as atonement for what he did to Genta. In the midst of Giff's invasion and helping the Igarashi family thwart it, Masumi's physical condition worsens until he eventually dies from his illness.

"Ushijima Family"
The " family" are Weekend agents assigned to work undercover as a family and regular customers at Shiawaseyu.

: A Weekend lieutenant tasked with working undercover as Kimiko's husband, Hikaru's father, and a regular patron of Shiawaseyu who lost his real wife and daughter at the hands of Deadmen. He would later sacrifice himself to save Hikaru, Sakura, and Aguilera from Hideo Akaishi, so the former could join his real family in the afterlife.
: A Weekend agent tasked with working undercover as Hikaru's mother and Tasuke's wife. She is later killed by a Hell Gifftarian while protecting civilians.

Vail
 is Genta Igarashi's sadistic inner demon who represents the latter's bloodlust and displays a desire to destroy everyone and everything around him for his own amusement and to spite Genta, his offspring, and their inner demons. Years prior to the series, Vail came into being after Genta was involved in a near-fatal biking incident and Masumi Karizaki infused Genta with Giff's cells to save his life. Following this, NOAH ordered Vail to murder Genta's parents to manipulate him and ruin his life before using the demon as a test subject until he outlived his usefulness. Shortly after Genta married Yukimi, Vail tried to murder the former's new family, but Masumi extracted the demon and contained him in the Demons Driver. Following NOAH's downfall, former NOAH researcher Hideo Akaishi found a half-dead Vail and spent the intervening years working to free him. After being awakened by Giff in the present, a revitalized Vail manipulates the Demons Driver's users to facilitate his escape in order to re-possess Genta before eventually regaining his corporeal form and joining forces with Akaishi to force the inner demons of Genta's children to join them and betray their respective hosts. As his body approaches its limit, Vail decides to settle his rivalry with Genta by transforming into a Kamen Rider-esque form called .

In combat, Vail is capable of using the Proto Vistamps' power to counter most of the other Riders' regular forms. Due to being separated from Genta by Masumi and despite Giff's power restoring his corporeal form, Vail uses regular Vistamps to prolong his dwindling existence. Vail later gains the ability to transform into the Kamen Rider Jack Revice-like Crimson Vail using the self-titled Vistamp, which he can also use as his personal weapon.

Chic
 is Masumi Karizaki's inner demon and a mad scientist who the latter transferred to his son George years prior, having influenced the latter's eccentric behavior. Chic assumes a human form after killing and possessing Masato Sotoumi, but is defeated by Kamen Riders Live, Jeanne, and Destream prior to the destruction of Area 666.

Guest characters
: A mysterious young man and undefeated champion of the Desire Grand Prix who can transform into .

Spin-off exclusive characters

Kamen Rider Century
 is the duo of Hideo Momose and his time-displaced father, Ryunosuke, who utilize a Rider system that was created in a possible post-apocalyptic future in the year 2071, 100 years after the debut of the original Kamen Rider TV series, and 50 years after Fenix failed to prevent Deadmans' invasion. The Momoses appear exclusively in the film Kamen Rider: Beyond Generations.

Utilizing the  belt, Ryunosuke's spirit merges with Hideo to transform into Kamen Rider Century. However due to the latter's inability to cooperate with his father, Century assumes an incomplete/berserker form called .

Ryunosuke Momose
 is a geneticist who joined Shocker as a researcher after being publicly shunned. While working for the organization, he participated in converting Takeshi Hongo into Kamen Rider 1 before attempting to desert Shocker, only to become a test subject for the Diablo Stamp and end up time-traveling to the year 2071, where he receives the Cyclotron Driver from George Karizaki so he can send his spirit back in time to the year 2021. However, this results in Ryunosuke's spirit being forcibly merged with his elderly son Hideo in order to facilitate his transformation into Kamen Rider Century. After reconciling with his son and defeating Diablo, Ryunosuke encourages Hideo to do the same with Shinichi before disappearing with the dystopian future.

Hideo Momose
 is a Shinkansen mechanic who hates his father, Ryunosuke, for abandoning their family and has a difficult relationship with his son  due to his job.

Shocker executive
An unnamed Shocker executive who appears exclusively in the film Kamen Rider: Beyond Generations. After discovering the Diablo Stamp, he led his team to test it on Ryunosuke, but the resulting experiment forced them to lock it away before Fenix recovered it in the present day.

Diablo
 is a powerful demon that appears exclusively in the film Kamen Rider: Beyond Generations. In the present day, Diablo is stopped by Kamen Riders Revice, Saber, and Century.
 

Crispers
The  are historical figure-themed demons born from  that Shocker created to guard five pillars of light to enact a ritual to fully resurrect Diablo, who absorbs the Stamps. They appear exclusively in the film Kamen Rider: Beyond Generations.

: A Himiko-themed monster stationed in Antarctica. She is destroyed by Kamen Riders Jeanne and Kenzan.
: A Khufu-themed monster stationed in Egypt. He is destroyed by Kamen Riders Blades and Slash.
: A Thomas Edison-themed monster stationed in Easter Island. He is destroyed by Kamen Riders Live and Espada.
: A Leonidas I-themed monster stationed in Siberia. He is destroyed by Kamen Riders Buster and Saikou.

Nijitenka
 is a lodge owned by Suzu Saionji that appears exclusively in the web-exclusive special Kamen Rider Revice: The Mystery.

Suzu Saionji
 is the owner of the Nijitenka and a scientist who, following the death of her fiancé Shōgo Ueshima, became bent on seeking revenge on George Karizaki and his greatest creation, Kamen Rider Revice, as well as continue Ueshima's projects. As part of her revenge plot, she develops and uses . After luring Naoya Kaido to steal his Orphnoch DNA and complete her Oblivian Stamp, she attempts to kill George and Revice, but is defeated by the latter and arrested while George retrieves the Monster Stamps' data.

Saionji utilizes the Oblivian Stamp to transform into the monster . While transformed, she can mimic the abilities of monsters that past Kamen Riders have previously fought.

Shinzō Hanawa
 is the Saionji household's caretaker and Suzu Saionji's loyal accomplice. After assisting Saionji in kidnapping Naoya Kaido, Hanawa is defeated by Kamen Rider Demons and arrested alongside Saionji.

Hanawa utilizes the Roidmude and Smash Stamps to transform into the Sword Roidmude and Stretch Smash Hazard.

Tarō Gondawara
 is a freelance writer with a fraud-based criminal record and an occupant of Nijitenka. He assists Suzu Saionji in her revenge scheme until he is killed by Shinzō Hanawa due to him making money by selling the mass-produced Monster Stamps behind her back.

Gondawara utilizes the Deadman Stamp to transform into the Orangutan Deadman.

Other occupants

: A restaurant worker with an assault-based criminal record.
: The Saionji household's maid.

Shōgo Ueshima
 was a scientist, rival to George Karizaki, and Suzu Saionji's fiancé who appears exclusively in the web-exclusive special Kamen Rider Revice: The Mystery. Ueshima developed the Monster Stamps and the Oblivian Stamp for Fenix's use. However, the organization chose George's Vistamps, causing Ueshima to go insane and die from overworking himself. Upon learning what had happened, Saionji vowed revenge against George.

Takako Kadota
 is Hiromi Kadota's mother who appears exclusively in the Blu-ray-exclusive special Dear Gaga. After Hiromi returns to their hometown, she nurses him back to health before dying from disease.

Yūki
 is a boy in Takako Kadota's neighborhood who appears exclusively in the Blu-ray-exclusive special Dear Gaga. A bullied child, he receives encouragement from Hiromi Kadota before standing up to his bullies.

NOAH
, short for Nest Of Anti-Human, was a militaristic organization with government ties that sought to harness and weaponize Giff's power for military applications. Unbeknownst to the organization, researcher Hideo Akaishi manipulated them into unknowingly preparing for Giff's revival and humanity's evolution. Following Junpei Shiranami, Masumi Karizaki, and Shōzō Irabu's desertions and Agariyama's death, Akaishi led some of its operatives in stealing Giff's casket and the Demons Driver before forming Deadmans and Fenix to continue his plans.

Agariyama
 is the director of NOAH who appears exclusively in the web-exclusive special Revice Legacy: Kamen Rider Vail. He arranged for Vail to kill Junpei Shiranami's parents to control the latter, only to be killed by the former after Vail first acquired a physical form.

Kenta Katagiri
 is Ikki's friend and a wedding planner who appears exclusively in the Hyper Battle DVD special.

Azuma
 is a man who formed a pact with Giff alongside Akaishi and appears exclusively in the film Kamen Rider Revice the Movie: Battle Familia and the web-exclusive special Birth of Chimera. Eight decades prior, while serving as Giff's judge to determine mankind's worth, he became disappointed by humanity and retired from the world. In the present day, Azuma begins to lose his immortality due to Giff's defeat and joins forces with Chic to obtain Giff's cells and regain his immortality. He also puts the mutated Ryū Mukai out of his misery, but indirectly kills Nozomu Ōtani's parents. Azuma eventually entrusts the future of humanity to Ikki before dying and finding peace in afterlife.

Azuma utilizes the  Vistamp in conjunction with the Chimera Driver to transform into the octopus/rhinoceros/centipede-themed .

Kamen Rider Chimera
 is a king crab/crocodile-themed moniker used by those who utilize the  Vistamp in conjunction with the  belt and appears exclusively in the film Kamen Rider Revice the Movie: Battle Familia and the web-exclusive special Birth of Chimera. The belt initially has the side effect of mutating its user into a demon until Chic incorporates one of Giff's eyes into it for Azuma's use

Ryū Mukai
 is Nozomu Ōtani's friend and the first Chimera who appears exclusively in the web-exclusive special Birth of Chimera. He turns into a demon due to the belt's side effects before he is destroyed by Kamen Rider Daimon.

Nozomu Ōtani
 is an aspiring doctor who seeks vengeance on Azuma for his parents' deaths and appears exclusively in the film Kamen Rider Revice the Movie: Battle Familia and the web-exclusive special Birth of Chimera. He struggles to help Genta and Yukimi save their fellow passengers aboard a hijacked airliner. Though Nozomu manages to take the Chimera Driver and become the new Chimera, Azuma takes it back.

Yume Takeda
 is a pregnant woman who gets involved in an airliner hijacking incident and appears exclusively in the film Kamen Rider Revice the Movie: Battle Familia.

Tony, Hakim, and Minami
Hakim and Minami offer themselves to create Gifftarians while Tony spawns the Mandrill Deadman.

Kōsei and Kazumi Ōtani
 and his ill wife  are Nozomu Ōtani's parents who appear exclusively in the web-exclusive special Birth of Chimera. They sacrifice themselves to shield their son from the explosion of a mutated Mukai.

Masato Sotoumi
 is a doctor who appears exclusively in the web-exclusive special Birth of Chimera. He is used by Chic before being killed and possessed by the demon.

Yuriko Kuroe
 is a member of Black Satan and  who claims to be Aguilera's older sister, to get close to her and appears exclusively in the web-exclusive special Kamen Rider Jeanne & Kamen Rider Aguilera with Girls Remix. She is saved by Kamen Rider Aguilera.

Ms. Titan
, real name , is a member of Black Satan who seeks to revive the organization and appears exclusively in the web-exclusive special Kamen Rider Jeanne & Kamen Rider Aguilera with Girls Remix. She evolves herself into her enhanced form before being defeated by Kamen Riders Jeanne, Aguilera, Sabela, Zero-Two, Tsukuyomi, and Poppy and arrested.

Ms. Titan is voiced by Rika Matsumoto, who also portrays Mitsuko Fujimoto and voices the Himiko Crisper.

Devil Hana
 is Aguilera's inner demon who resembles the latter in dark clothes and appears exclusively in the web-exclusive special Kamen Rider Jeanne & Kamen Rider Aguilera with Girls Remix.

While possessing Aguilera's body, her inner demon utilizes the Queen Bee Vistamp in conjunction with the Week EnDriver to transform into .

Devil Hana is portrayed by Yui Asakura, who also portrays Aguilera.

Yūichirō Wakabayashi
 is Yūjirō Wakabayashi's older twin brother who appears exclusively in the stage show Kamen Rider Revice: Final Stage. Under the belief that his brother died because of Fenix, Yūichirō awakens his inner demon, in the hopes of avenging the organization. After being defeated by Kamen Rider Revice Shin, he learns the truth of what happened and is taken into Blue Bird's custody.

Yūichirō utilizes the Crimson Vail Vistamp to merge with Vade and transform into , a Kamen Rider-esque form that resembles Crimson Vail.

Yūichirō Wakabayashi and Vade are portrayed by Kazuya Tanabe, who also portrays Yūjirō Wakabayashi.

Kōshirō Igarashi
 is the youngest child of the Igarashi family who appears exclusively in the film Kamen Rider Geats × Revice: Movie Battle Royale.

Kōshirō's inner demon
Kōshirō's unnamed inner demon appears exclusively in the film Kamen Rider Geats × Revice: Movie Battle Royale.

Baridero and Izangi
Following Giff's death, the pair use a dimensional rift created during the event to travel to Earth and join forces with Korath to kidnap Kōshirō Igarashi's inner demon before they are killed by Kamen Rider Ultimate Revice.

Additionally, the former portrays a fictionalized version of himself and voices Kamen Rider Juuga's system.

Kagetaka Ichimura
He absorbs Rumi and transforms into a Transamsa Level 4. However, he is destroyed by Kamen Riders Live Marvelous, Evil Marvelous, and Imperial Demons, freeing Rumi.

Rumi
 is a girl with a unique condition who has been used by Kagetaka Ichimura since childhood and appears exclusively in the V-Cinema Revice Forward: Kamen Rider Live & Evil & Demons.

Shunichirō Somei
 is a Human Mutant and a figurehead leader of Alicorn who can transform into a Transamsa Level 3 and appears exclusively in the V-Cinema Revice Forward: Kamen Rider Live & Evil & Demons. He is destroyed by Kamen Riders Live Marvelous and Evil Marvelous.

Yukio and Mariko
They are killed by Shunichirō Somei.

Muramasa
 is a Human Mutant created from the DNA of Hiromi Kadota who can transform into a Transamsa Level 2 and appears exclusively in the V-Cinema Revice Forward: Kamen Rider Live & Evil & Demons. He is destroyed by Kamen Rider Imperial Demons.

Muramasa is portrayed by Junya Komatsu, who also portrays Hiromi Kadota.

Notes

References

External links
 

Revice
, Kamen Rider Revice